The Supreme Allied Commander Europe (SACEUR) is the commander of the North Atlantic Treaty Organization's (NATO) Allied Command Operations (ACO) and head of ACO's headquarters, Supreme Headquarters Allied Powers Europe (SHAPE). The commander is based at SHAPE in Casteau, Belgium. SACEUR is the second-highest military position within NATO, below only the Chair of the NATO Military Committee in terms of precedence.

SACEUR has always been held by a U.S. military officer, and the position is dual-hatted with that of Commander of United States European Command.

The current SACEUR is General Christopher G. Cavoli of the United States Army.

Role

List of holders

Since 2003 the Supreme Allied Commander Europe (SACEUR) has also served as the head of Allied Command Europe and the head of Allied Command Operations.
The officeholders have been:

Deputy
The position of Deputy Supreme Allied Command Europe (DSACEUR) has been known as Deputy Head of Allied Command Operations since 2003. From January 1978 until June 1993 there were two DSACEURs, one British and one German, but from July 1993 this reverted to a single DSACEUR.  With a small number of exceptions who were German military officers, DSACEUR is normally a British military officer. The officeholders have been as follows:

Role in intra-European defence integration

SACEUR's planned role for the European Defence Community

If the treaty founding the European Defence Community (EDC) had not failed to acquire ratification in the French Parliament in 1954, the EDC would have entailed a pan-European military, divided into national components, and had a common budget, common arms, centralized military procurement, and institutions. The EDC would have had an integral link to NATO, forming an autonomous European pillar in the Atlantic alliance. The following chard illustrates the role of SACEUR in such an arrangement.

DSACEUR's role in European Union missions
Under the 2002 Berlin Plus agreement, SHAPE may take part in the European Union's (EU) command and control structure as an operational headquarters (OHQ) for EU missions. In such an instance, the Deputy Supreme Allied Commander Europe (DSACEUR), who is always a European, would serve as Operation Commander (OpCdr). This use of SHAPE by the EU is however subject to a "right of first refusal", i.e. NATO must first decline to intervene in a given crisis, and contingent on unanimous approval among NATO states, including those outside of the EU.

See also
 Supreme Allied Commander Transformation
 Supreme Commander for the Allied Powers
 Supreme Allied Commander
 Secretary General of NATO
 Chairman of the NATO Military Committee
 Supreme Commander of the Unified Armed Forces of the Warsaw Treaty Organization

References

External links

 

NATO Supreme Allied Commanders